The Burch Peaks are a group of peaks  east of Mount Torckler in Enderby Land. They were plotted from air photos taken from Australian National Antarctic Research Expeditions aircraft in 1957, and named by the Antarctic Names Committee of Australia for W.M. Burch, a geophysicist at Wilkes Station in 1961.

References 

Mountains of Enderby Land